The Woods Hole Oceanographic Institution (WHOI, acronym pronounced  ) is a private, nonprofit research and higher education facility dedicated to the study of marine science and engineering.

Established in 1930 in Woods Hole, Massachusetts, it is the largest independent oceanographic research institution in the U.S., with staff and students numbering about 1,000.

Constitution

The Institution is organized into six departments, the Cooperative Institute for Climate and Ocean Research, and a marine policy center. Its shore-based facilities are located in the village of Woods Hole, Massachusetts, United States and a mile and a half away on the Quissett Campus. The bulk of the Institution's funding comes from grants and contracts from the National Science Foundation and other government agencies, augmented by foundations and private donations.

WHOI scientists, engineers, and students collaborate to develop theories, test ideas, build seagoing instruments, and collect data in diverse marine environments. Ships operated by WHOI carry research scientists throughout the world's oceans. The WHOI fleet includes two large research vessels (Atlantis and Neil Armstrong), the coastal craft Tioga, small research craft such as the dive-operation work boat Echo, the deep-diving human-occupied submersible Alvin, the tethered, remotely operated vehicle Jason/Medea, and autonomous underwater vehicles such as the REMUS and SeaBED.

WHOI offers graduate and post-doctoral studies in marine science. There are several fellowship and training programs, and graduate degrees are awarded through a joint program with the Massachusetts Institute of Technology (MIT). WHOI is accredited by the New England Association of Schools and Colleges. WHOI also offers public outreach programs and informal education through its Exhibit Center and summer tours. The Institution has a volunteer program and a membership program, WHOI Associate. 

WHOI shares a library, the MBLWHOI Library, with the Marine Biological Laboratory. The MBLWHOI Library holds print and electronic collections in the biological, biomedical, ecological, and oceanographic sciences. The library also conducts digitization and informatics projects.

On October 1, 2020, Peter B. de Menocal became the institution's eleventh president and director.

History

In 1927, a National Academy of Sciences committee concluded that it was time to "consider the share of the United States of America in a worldwide program of oceanographic research." The committee's recommendation for establishing a permanent independent research laboratory on the East Coast to "prosecute oceanography in all its branches" led to the founding in 1930 of the Woods Hole Oceanographic Institution.

A $2.5 million grant from the Rockefeller Foundation supported the summer work of a dozen scientists, construction of a laboratory building and commissioning of a research vessel, the  ketch , whose profile still forms the Institution's logo.

WHOI grew substantially to support significant defense-related research during World War II, and later began a steady growth in staff, research fleet, and scientific stature. From 1950 to 1956, the director was Dr. Edward "Iceberg" Smith, an Arctic explorer, oceanographer and retired Coast Guard rear admiral.

In 1977 the institution appointed oceanographer John Steele as director, and he served until his retirement in 1989.

On 3 April 2011, within a week of resuming of the search operation for Air France Flight 447, a team led by WHOI, operating full ocean depth autonomous underwater vehicles (AUVs) owned by the Waitt Institute discovered, by means of sidescan sonar, a large portion of debris field from flight AF447.

In March 2017 the institution effected an open-access policy to make its research publicly accessible online.

The Institution has maintained a long and controversial business collaboration with the treasure hunter company Odyssey Marine. WHOI has participated in the location of the San José galleon in Colombia for the commercial exploitation of the shipwreck by the Government of President Santos and a private company.

In 2019,  reported that China's hackers had launched cyberattacks on dozens of academic institutions in an attempt to gain information on technology being developed for the United States Navy. Some of the targets included the Woods Hole Oceanographic Institution. The attacks had been underway since at least April 2017.

Military contracting 
The Woods Hole Oceanographic Institution develops technology for the United States Navy, including ocean battlespace sensors, unmanned undersea vehicles, and acoustic navigation and communication systems for operations in the Arctic. The Institution is also working on Project Sundance for the Office of Naval Research.

Awards issued

B. H. Ketchum Award
The B. H. Ketchum award, established in 1983, is presented for innovative coastal/nearshore research and is named in honor of oceanographer Bostwick H. "Buck" Ketchum. The award is administered by the WHOI Coastal Ocean Institute and Rinehart Coastal Research Center.

Recipients:

 2017: Don Anderson, Woods Hole Oceanographic Institution
 2015: Candace Oviatt, Graduate School of Oceanography, University of Rhode Island
 2010: James E. Cloern, United States Geological Survey
 2007: Richard Garvine, University of Delaware
 2003: John Farrington, Woods Hole Oceanographic Institution
 2003: Nancy Rabalais, Louisiana Universities Marine Consortium
 1999: Willard Moore, University of South Carolina
 1996: Ronald Smith, Loughbororugh University
 1995: Christopher Martens, University of North Carolina
 1992: Scott Nixon, University of Rhode Island
 1990: Daniel Lynch, Dartmouth College
 1989: William Boicourt, University of Maryland
 1988: Alasdair McIntyre, Aberdeen University (Emeritus)
 1986: John S. Allen, Oregon State University
 1985: Thomas H. Pearson, Oban, Argyll, Scotland
 1985: Michael Moore, Plymouth, UK
 1984: Edward D. Goldberg, Scripps Institution of Oceanography

Henry Bryant Bigelow Medal in Oceanography
The Henry Bryant Bigelow Medal in Oceanography was established in 1960 in honor of the first WHOI Director, biologist Henry Bryant Bigelow.

Recipients: Source:
2004 David M. Karl (Professor of Oceanography, University of Hawaii) – for "his contributions to microbial oceanography, especially the development and leadership of long-term, integrated studies of chemical, physical, and biological variations in oceanic environments."
1996 Bill J. Jenkins (Senior Scientist, Marine Chemistry & Geochemistry, WHOI) – for "his outstanding contributions to the development of the tritium-helium dating technique and its application to problems in ocean physics and biology and geochemistry, as well as his exceptional character and selfless dedication to the advance of science at WHOI."
1993 Robert Weller (Senior Scientist, Physical Oceanography; Director, CICOR; WHOI)
1992 Alice Louise Alldredge (University of California, Santa Barbara) and Mary Wilcox Silver (University of California, Santa Cruz) – for "their creative contributions to biological and chemical oceanography, particularly in demonstrating the importance of ‘marine snow’ as a major contributor to the vertical flux of particulate matter throughout the worlds oceans."
1988 Hans Thomas Rossby (University of Rhode Island) and Douglas Chester Webb (Webb Research) – for "Their creative contributions to ocean technology and oceanography, particularly in the development of the SOFAR float and advancing out knowledge of Lagrangian ocean dynamics."
1984 Arnold L. Gordon (Columbia University) for his "dedication in completing the Antarctic Circumpolar Survey"
1980 Holger W. Jannasch (WHOI) – for his "creative contributions to marine microbiology by providing us with an understanding of the fundamentals of microbial processes in the sea and the dynamics of oceanic food chains."
1979 Wolfgang Helmut Berger (Scripps Institution of Oceanography, University of California at San Diego) – for his "creative contributions to paleoceanography by opening the doors of perception on the controlling factors governing carbonate sedimentation in the oceans, and for providing us with a unifying conceptual model for interpreting the geological evolution of ocean basins."
1974 Henry M. Stommel (WHOI)
1970 Frederick J. Vine (WHOI) – In recognition of his "imaginative and sound contributions to man’s understanding of the formative processes active within the earth."
1966 Columbus O'D. Iselin (WHOI) 
1964 Bruce C. Heezen (WHOI)
1962 John C. Swallow (WHOI)
1960 Henry Bryant Bigelow

Scientists 
Over the years, WHOI scientists have made seminal discoveries about the ocean that have contributed to improving US commerce, health, national security, and quality of life. They have received awards and recognition from scientific societies such as The Oceanography Society, the American Geophysical Union, Association for the Sciences of Limnology and Oceanography, and several others.

Notable scientists include:

 Amy Bower, senior scientist, blind oceanographer
 Stan Hart, scientist emeritus, William Bowie Medal recipient
 Elizabeth Kujawinski, American oceanographer, Woods Hole Senior Scientist
 Loral O’Hara, research engineer, NASA Astronaut Candidate
 Christopher Reddy, senior scientist, oil spill researcher
 Heidi Sosik, senior scientist in Biology, inventor
 Klaus Hasselmann, Doherty Professor at Woods Hole Oceanographic Institution from 1970 to 1972

Research fleet

Ships

WHOI operates several research vessels, owned by the United States Navy, the National Science Foundation, or the Institution:
 R/V Atlantis (AGOR-25) – 274 feet long, mothership of the Alvin submarine
 R/V Tioga (WHOI-owned) – 60 feet long
 R/V Neil Armstrong (AGOR-27) – 238 feet long

WHOI formerly operated R/V Knorr, which was replaced by R/V Neil Armstrong in 2015.

Small boat fleet
WHOI operates many small boats used in inland harbors, ponds, rivers, and coastal bays. All are owned by the Institution itself.
 Motorboat Echo – 29 feet long (mainly used as a work boat to support dive operations, also the newest small research craft at WHOI)
 Motorboat Mytilus – 24 feet long (mainly used in water too shallow for larger craft and is a versatile coastal research boat)
 Motorboat Calanus – 21 feet long (mainly used in local water bodies such as Great Harbor, Vineyard Sound and Buzzards Bay)
 Motorboat Limulus – 13 feet long (mainly used to shuttle equipment to larger craft and as a work platform for near-shore research tasks)
 Rowboat Orzrus – 12 feet long (mainly used in harbors and ponds where motor craft are not permitted)

Underwater vehicles

WHOI also has developed numerous underwater autonomous and remotely operated vehicles for research:
 Alvin (DSV-2) – human-occupied vehicle, the Institution's most well-known equipment
 Deepsea Challenger – human-occupied vehicle designed, field-tested, and later donated to the WHOI by Canadian film director James Cameron
 Jason – a remotely operated vehicle (ROV)
 Sentry – an autonomous underwater vehicle (AUV) and successor to ABE
 Nereus – A hybrid remotely operated vehicle (HROV); lost on 5/10/14 while exploring the Kermadec Trench.
 Remus – Remote Environment Monitoring UnitS, a family of autonomous underwater vehicles
 SeaBED – an autonomous underwater vehicle optimized for high-resolution seafloor imaging
 Spray Glider – a remotely operated vehicle, used to collect data about the salinity, temperature, etc. about an area
 Slocum Glider – another remotely operated vehicle, with functions similar to the functions of the Spray Glider
 CAMPER – a towed vehicle used to collect samples from the seabed of the Arctic Ocean
 Seasoar – a submarine towed by a ship
 TowCam – a submarine with cameras that is towed by a ship along the ocean floor to take photographs
 Video Plankton Recorder – a submarine with microscopic camera systems, towed along by a ship to take videos of plankton
 Autonomous Benthic Explorer (ABE) – an autonomous underwater vehicle

Notable people 

 Lisan Yu – known for serving on the Earth Science Advisory Committee (ESAC), and on the Federal Advisory Committee Act (FACA) committee of NASA.

See also 

 52-hertz whale
 Liquid Jungle Lab, a tropical research station in Pacific Panama operated by WHOI
 Marine Biological Laboratory, a neighboring but administratively unrelated institution in Woods Hole
 The Institute of Marine and Coastal Sciences, a smaller oceanographic facility located at Rutgers University in New Jersey
 Harbor Branch Oceanographic Institute, a similar research facility associated with Florida Atlantic University and located in Fort Pierce, Florida
 Hatfield Marine Science Center, a similar research facility associated with the Oregon State University and located in Newport, Oregon
 Hopkins Marine Station, a similar research facility run by Stanford University in Monterey, California
 Moss Landing Marine Laboratories, a multi-campus marine research consortium of the California State University System
 Scripps Institution of Oceanography, a similar research facility associated with the University of California, San Diego and located in La Jolla, California
 Ocean Frontier Institute, an ocean research centre located in Halifax, Canada

References

External links
 Woods Hole Oceanographic Institution

 
Independent research institutes
Oceanographic organizations
Research institutes in Massachusetts
Education in Barnstable County, Massachusetts
Research institutes established in 1930
1930 in biology
1930 establishments in Massachusetts
Falmouth, Massachusetts
Private universities and colleges in Massachusetts